Sterile alpha motif domain containing 4B is a protein that in humans is encoded by the SAMD4B gene.

References

Further reading